Michael Lee "Mickey" Thompson (December 7, 1928March 16, 1988) was an American auto racing builder and promoter.

A hot rodder since his youth, Thompson increasingly pursued land speed records in his late 20s and early 30s.  He achieved international fame in 1960, when he became the first American to break the 400-mph barrier, driving his Challenger 1  to a one-way top speed of 406.60 mph at the Bonneville Salt Flats and surpassing John Cobb's one-way world record mark of 402 mph.

Thompson then turned to racing, winning many track and dragster championships. In the 1960s, he also entered cars at the Indianapolis 500. Later, he formed off-road racing sanctioning bodies SCORE International and Mickey Thompson Entertainment Group (MTEG).

In 1988, Thompson and his wife Trudy were gunned down at their home in Bradbury, California.  The crime remained unsolved until 2007, when a former business partner was convicted of having orchestrated the murders.

Early life

On December 7, 1928 Thompson was born in Alhambra, California. Thompson's father was Captain Marion L. Thompson, a former police officer with Alhambra Police Department. Thompson's sister is Collene Thompson Campbell.

Career 
In his early 20s, he worked as a pressman for the Los Angeles Times while pursuing a lifelong love of hot rodding. He later became involved in the new sport of drag racing. Tireless and innovative, he found success as a championship driver and instinctive automotive technician.

Over the course of his career, Thompson set more speed and endurance records than any other man in automotive history. He is credited with designing and building the first slingshot dragster, in 1954, moving the seat behind the rear axle to improve traction when existing racing tires proved unable to handle the output of increasingly powerful custom engines. This car, the Panorama City Special, debuted at the first NHRA U.S. Nationals at the Great Bend Municipal Airport in Great Bend, Kansas, in 1955. A change so momentous would not happen again until Don Garlits introduced the rear-engined digger in 1971. Thompson also was noted for being the first manager of Lions Drag Strip in Wilmington, California, in 1955.

Thompson collaborated with Fritz Voight on a 1958 twin-engined dragster.

Indy years

1962
In 1962, Thompson entered three John Crosthwaite-designed  cars in the Indianapolis 500. Unusually, they used a stock V8 Buick engine, and it was in the rear unlike the front-engined, race-tuned, Offenhauser-powered cars used by most competitors. It was the first stock engine to be raced at Indy since 1946.  Thompson's crew, led by Fritz Voigt, was young, smart, and hard working. Working 12- to 14-hour days, the car was designed and built in 120 days.  For the race, the engine (enlarged to 4.2-L capacity, the maximum allowed by the regulations for "stock block" engines) had to be detuned because they were concerned it would not last the distance. Despite being more than 70 bhp down on the other cars, Dan Gurney qualified eighth and was in ninth place until a leaking oil seal seized the gearbox and ended his race on lap 94. He was placed 20th out of 33. The team won the Mechanical Achievement Award for original design, construction, and accomplishment.

1963
Thompson's promotional skills pleased the sponsors with the publicity generated that year. Thompson took five cars to Indianapolis - two of the previous year's design with Chevrolet V8 engines and three roller skate cars. One of the new cars, the Harvey Titanium Special, featured a lightweight titanium chassis. Al Miller raced one of the modified 1962 cars to ninth place despite only qualifying in 31st position. Duane Carter qualified one of the roller skate cars 15th, but was only placed 23rd after an engine failure on the 100th lap. The small tire sizes and low car weights caused complaints among the old hands and owners, so for future races, cars were restricted to minimum tire sizes and minimum car weights.

 Formula One World Champion Graham Hill tested one of the roller skate cars at Indianapolis in 1963, but refused to race it, citing its poor handling.  The recent ruling required 15-in wheels, but the chassis was designed around smaller wheels. Thompson commented: "The car wouldn't handle", adding, "There was too much body roll due to the high center of gravity."

In 1963, Thompson traveled to England, where along with Dante Duce, he demonstrated his Ford-powered top fuel Harvey Aluminum Special dragster at the Brighton Speed Trials. It was then displayed at the Racing Car Show in London in January 1964.

1964
Thompson brought three modified 12-inch-tired cars to the 1964 Indianapolis 500, but new rules required him to use 15-in tires. The Allstate sponsored team used Allstate tires and Ford engines. The chassis had to be altered to accommodate the larger Ford engines. Two of them qualified for the race. The car No. 84 began the month with Masten Gregory as the driver, but Eddie Johnson in car No. 84 qualified 24th and finished 26th. Dave MacDonald in car No. 83 qualified 14th and died in a fiery crash on the second lap.

1965–1968
Thompson went back to Indy in 1965, but failed to qualify in an attempt with a front-engined roadster. He skipped 1966, but tried again in 1967 and 1968, again failing to qualify either year.
The 1967 attempt used a unique all-wheel drive rear-engined design that steered both front and rear wheels, but Gary Congdon was unable to qualify any of the three cars.

Post Indy

In 1965, Thompson published Challenger: Mickey Thompson's own story of his life of Speed. In 1968 Danny Ongais and he 
took three Ford Mustang Mach 1 to the Bonneville salt flats for a feature in Hot Rod magazine, in the process setting 295 speed and endurance records over a series of 500-mile and 24-hour courses. Together with John Buttera and Pat Foster, developed a Ford Mustang Mach 1 Funny Car with a dragster-like chassis. Driven by Ongais, the car won the 1969 NHRA Spring Nationals at Dallas and the NHRA U.S. Nationals.

In his long career, Thompson raced vehicles from stock cars to off-road, and engineered numerous competition engines.  He went into the performance aftermarket business in the early 1960s and then, in 1963, he created "Mickey Thompson Performance Tires" that developed special tires for racing including for Indianapolis 500 competitors.

Thompson founded SCORE International in 1973, a sanctioning body to oversee off-road racing across North America. With his wife Trudy he formed the Mickey Thompson Entertainment Group (MTEG), which ran an indoor motocross and off-road vehicle racing show and competition that brought the sport from the back-country to major metropolitan stadiums and arenas.

Personal life 
Thompson's wife was Trudy Thompson. On March 16, 1988, Thompson and his wife Trudy were murdered in Bradbury, California.

Murder

On March 16, 1988, Thompson and his wife Trudy were killed by two hooded gunmen outside their home in Bradbury, California, in the foothills of the San Gabriel Mountains.

On the morning of the murder, a pair of unknown assailants waited outside the Thompson home for the couple to leave for the day. Mickey opened the garage door for his wife to pull out in her vehicle, and as he headed for his own car, the gunmen attacked.  He was shot and wounded, then dragged out into the driveway while one of the attackers went after Trudy as she backed out.  Killing her, the gunman then came back up the driveway, where the other gunman was watching over Mickey and shot him fatally in the head. The attackers then made their escape on the bicycles they had ridden to the Thompson residence. Expensive jewelry and a large amount of cash were found on the Thompsons' bodies, eliminating robbery as a likely motive.

An intense police investigation initially failed to uncover either the identity of the mystery gunmen, or a motive for the crime. Police were interested in Thompson's former business partner Michael Frank Goodwin who  repeatedly refused to pay a more than $768,000 settlement he owed Thompson. Goodwin and his wife bought $275,000 worth of gold coins two months before the Thompsons were murdered and wired $400,000 to banks on the island Grand Turk and Caicos. Goodwin and his wife then left the country five months after the murder on their yacht and did not return for more than two years.

The case remained unsolved until 2001, when Goodwin was charged in Orange County, California with the murders. Before a trial could be completed, it was ended on jurisdictional grounds by the California District Court of Appeal. On June 8, 2004, Goodwin was formally charged with the murders in Pasadena, in Los Angeles County. In October 2006, a Pasadena Superior Court judge ordered Goodwin to stand trial.

During the trial, a long series of witnesses reported hearing Goodwin threaten to kill the Thompsons. “I’m going to kill that son of a bitch. I’m going to kill that motherfucker. I’m going to take out Mickey. I’m too smart to get caught. I’ll have him wasted. He’ll never see a nickel. I’ll kill him first. Mickey doesn’t know who he is fucking with. He is fucking dead.”

Although the prosecution did not establish a direct connection between the murderers and Goodwin, the circumstantial evidence was sufficient to convict him. On January 4, 2007, a jury found Goodwin guilty of two counts of murder in the death of Thompson and his wife. Goodwin was sentenced to two consecutive life-without-parole terms. A subsequent motion for a new trial was denied. In the 2015 California 2nd District Court of Appeal ruling, although no direct evidence connected Goodwin to the case, the array of circumstantial evidence was found to be "overwhelming". The two men who murdered the Thompsons have not been located.

TV coverage, and its fictionalization through the television program CSI, were cited by the defense team during the murder trial as having created a "folklore" around the case, preventing a fair trial.

Thompson, his wife, and his pets are interred in the Rose Hills Memorial Park, in Whittier, California.

In popular culture 

 CBS's To Tell The Truth.  Appeared as a contestant in March 1962
 NBC's Unsolved Mysteries
 Investigation Discovery's Murder Book. 
 CBS television program 48 Hours Mystery April 28, 2007
 CSI episode "Early Rollout" (2004) was based on this murder case.

Awards
 Thompson was inducted posthumously to the Motorsports Hall of Fame of America
 1990 Inducted to International Motorsports Hall of Fame. 
 Thompson was ranked No. 11 on the National Hot Rod Association Top 50 Drivers, 1951–2000
 Thompson was inducted posthumously to the Off-Road Motorsports Hall of Fame in 2007, and the Automotive Hall of Fame in 2009.

See also
 Semon Knudsen
 Stadium Super Trucks, a racing series inspired by Thompson's stadium off-road racing
 Danny Thompson, Thompson's son, also a race car driver

References

External links
News release on documentary of the murder 
Trial Commentary
M/T Tires Official Page
Michael Goodwin profile on America's Most Wanted
 Murder On the Last Turn LA Weekly October 18, 2006
 Lions the Greatest Drag Strip Part One at nhramuseum.org

Additional sources 
Taylor, Thom.  "Beauty Beyond the Twilight Zone" in Hot Rod, April 2017, pp. 30–43.

1928 births
1988 deaths
1988 murders in the United States
Bonneville 300 MPH Club members
Brighton Speed Trials people
Deaths by firearm in California
Dragster drivers
International Motorsports Hall of Fame inductees
Land speed record people
Male murder victims
Off-road racing drivers
Sportspeople from Alhambra, California
People murdered in California
Racing drivers from California
Racing drivers from Los Angeles
World Sportscar Championship drivers
People from Bradbury, California
Burials at Rose Hills Memorial Park
Carrera Panamericana drivers